Nathan Chapman is an American record producer who works in the field of country music. He is known primarily for working with American singer-songwriter Taylor Swift, having co-produced with Swift for her albums Taylor Swift, Fearless, Speak Now, Red and 1989. Taylor Swift was also the first album that he produced  and he is a 2001 graduate of Lee University. He was said to be working in a shack before producing music with various artists. It was a converted one-car garage just off Music Row in Nashville, TN. 

At the 52nd Grammy Awards in 2010, Chapman won the Grammy Award for Album of the Year for working as a co-producer on Swift's album Fearless and he won the same award at the 58th Grammy Awards in 2016 for co-producing Swift's album 1989. He also co-produced the song "This Love" on the album 1989, it was his first time co-producing a pop song. 

Other acts for whom Chapman has produced include Kylie Minogue, Martina McBride, The Band Perry, Jypsi, Point of Grace, Keith Urban, Krystall Keith, Shania Twain, Lady Antebellum, Electra Mustaine, Madeline Merlo, Tenille Arts, and Jimmy Wayne. In addition to his production work Chapman is a session musician who plays guitar, banjo, and mandolin.

Awards and nominations

References

American country banjoists
American country guitarists
American male guitarists
Record producers from Tennessee
American country record producers
Grammy Award winners
Living people
American mandolinists
Lee University alumni
Guitarists from Tennessee
Country musicians from Tennessee
Year of birth missing (living people)